Axiothauma albinodosum is a species of tephritid or fruit flies in the genus Axiothauma of the family Tephritidae.

Distribution
Kenya.

References

Tephritinae
Insects described in 1946
Diptera of Africa